Julia Bascom is an American autism rights activist. She is the current Executive Director of the Autistic Self Advocacy Network (ASAN) and replaced Ari Ne'eman as president of ASAN in early 2017.

Advocacy work 
Bascom previously worked on the New Hampshire State Developmental Disabilities Council.  She also serves on the boards of Advance CLASS, Inc. and the Centene National Advisory Council on Disability. She was the Deputy Executive Director of ASAN, and replaced Ari Ne'eman as president of ASAN in 2017.

Bascom was one of the experts consulted to create an autistic character, Julia, for the children's show Sesame Street.

As an autistic person herself and an advocate, Bascom stresses the importance of letting autistic people speak for themselves on issues that relate to their health, rights and well-being. She states that it is important to recognize that autistic people are different and that there "is nothing wrong with us". On April 2, 2018, Bascom addressed the "state of women and girls with autism" at the United Nations.

Loud Hands Project 
Bascom organized and founded the Loud Hands project. Loud Hands was designed to be a "transmedia project", that is, one that uses "multiple forms of content--written words, videos, visual art, the internet, and more". The project was launched in December 2011 as crowdfunding campaign to create an anthology of essays written by autistic people. The resulting anthology, Loud Hands: Autistic People, Speaking, was described as "groundbreaking" in Steve Silberman's NeuroTribes. The project has put together over 20 years of culture, history and writing by and about autistic people.

Bibliography 
Loud Hands: Autistic People, Speaking (8 December 2012) (editor)
And Straight on Till Morning: Essays on Autism Acceptance (28 March 2013) (editor)
The Obsessive Joy of Autism (21 May 2015)

References 

Autism activists
American disability rights activists
Living people
Year of birth missing (living people)
People on the autism spectrum